Theo Zwierski (1911–1989) was a German art director who designed the sets on a number of West German films and television productions.

Selected filmography
 Uncle Kruger (1941)
 After the Rain Comes Sunshine (1949)
 The Girl from the South Seas (1950)
 Das gestohlene Jahr (1951)
 Falschmünzer am Werk (1951)
 Salto Mortale (1953)
 Man on a Tightrope (1953)
 Carnival Story (1954)
 Ten on Every Finger (1954)
 The Phantom of the Big Tent (1954)
 Operation Edelweiss (1954)
 Night People (1954)
 Circus of Love (1954)
 Love's Carnival (1955)
 Von der Liebe besiegt (1956)
 The Legs of Dolores (1957)
 Mein ganzes Herz ist voll Musik (1959)

References

Bibliography
 Fritsche, Maria. Homemade Men In Postwar Austrian Cinema: Nationhood, Genre and Masculinity . Berghahn Books, 2013.
 Meier, Gustav. Filmstadt Göttingen: Bilder für eine neue Welt? : zur Geschichte der Göttinger Spielfilmproduktion 1945 bis 1961. Reichold, 1996.

External links

1911 births
1989 deaths
German art directors
Film people from Berlin